Evgeniy Borisov (born March 7, 1984) is a Russian hurdler. He placed third at the 60 metres hurdles at the 2008 World Indoor Championships in Valencia alongside Staņislavs Olijars. His personal best in the 60 m hurdles came at the 2008 European Athletics Indoor Cup in Moscow when he won the event in 7.44, breaking his previous best by 0.14 seconds. This put him 22nd on the all-time list. His 110 metres hurdles best is 13.55.

Competition record

See also
List of IAAF World Indoor Championships medalists (men)

References

External links

1984 births
Living people
Russian male hurdlers
Olympic athletes of Russia
Athletes (track and field) at the 2008 Summer Olympics
Russian Athletics Championships winners